Sir Thomas Little Heath  (5 October 1861 – 16 March 1940) was a British civil servant, mathematician, classical scholar, historian of ancient Greek mathematics, translator, and mountaineer. He was educated at Clifton College. Heath translated works of Euclid of Alexandria, Apollonius of Perga, Aristarchus of Samos, and Archimedes of Syracuse into English.

Life
Heath was born in Barnetby-le-Wold, Lincolnshire, England,being the third son of a farmer, Samuel Heath. He was educated at Caistor Grammar School and Clifton College before entering Trinity College, Cambridge, where he was awarded an ScD in 1896  and became an Honorary Fellow in 1920.He got first class honours in both the classical tripos and mathematical tripos and was the twelfth wrangler in 1882. In 1884 he took the Civil Service examination and became an Assistant Secretary to the Treasury, finally becoming Joint Permanent Secretary to the Treasury and auditor of the Civil List in 1913. He held the position till 1919 when he was appointed as the comptroller of the National Debt Office, from which he retired at the end of 1926 because of age limitations. He was honoured for his work in the Civil Service by being appointed Companion of the Order of the Bath in 1903, Knight Commander of the Order of the Bath in 1909, and Knight Commander of the Royal Victorian Order in 1916. He was elected a Fellow of the Royal Society in May 1912.

He died in Ashtead, Surrey. He had married professional musician Ada Mary Thomas in 1914; they had a son, Geoffrey Thomas Heath, and a daughter, Veronica Mary Heath. Heath's son Geoffrey went to Trinity College, Cambridge, before becoming a teacher at Ampleforth College, and had 6 children.

Work
Heath was distinguished for his work in Greek mathematics and was author of several books on Greek mathematicians. It is primarily through Heath's translations that modern English-speaking readers are aware of what Archimedes did. His translation of the celebrated Archimedes Palimpsest, however, was based on a transcription that had lacunae, which scholars such as Reviel Netz have been able to fill in to a certain extent, by exploiting scientific methods of imagery not available in Heath's time.

When Heath's Works of Archimedes was published in 1897, the Archimedes Palimpsest had not been extensively explored.  Its significance was not recognised until 1906, when it was examined by Danish professor Johan Ludvig Heiberg. The palimpsest contained an extended version of Stomachion, and a treatise entitled The Method of Mechanical Theorems that had previously been thought lost. These works have been a focus of research by later scholars.

Translations and other works
Note: Only first editions are listed; many of these titles have been reprinted several times.

 Diophantus of Alexandria: a Study in the History of Greek Algebra (Cambridge: Cambridge University Press, 1885)
 Apollonius of Perga: Treatise on Conic Sections (Cambridge: Cambridge University Press, 1896)
 Archimedes: Works (Cambridge: Cambridge University Press, 1897)
 The thirteen books of Euclid's Elements (Cambridge: Cambridge University Press, 1908)
 Aristarchus of Samos, the Ancient Copernicus Oxford: Clarendon Press, 1913)
 Euclid in Greek, Book I, With Introduction and Notes (Cambridge: Cambridge University Press, 1920)
 A History of Greek Mathematics, in two volumes (Oxford: Clarendon Press, 1921)
 A Manual of Greek Mathematics (Oxford: Clarendon Press, 1931)
 Greek Astronomy (London: J.M. Dent & Sons, 1932)
 Mathematics in Aristotle (Oxford: Clarendon Press, 1949)

Notes

Further reading
"About the translator: Thomas L. Heath" in Euclid's Elements: all thirteen books complete in one volume (2002) Green Lion Press. 
J.A. Smith, Review of A History of Greek Mathematics, The Classical Review, 37, no. 34 (May – June 1923), 69–71

External links

Online texts of Heath's books
 
 
 A History of Greek Mathematics: vol. 1, vol. 2
 The Works of Archimedes
 Archimedes' Quadrature Of The Parabola
 Archimedes' On The Measurement Of The Circle
 Diophantus Of Alexandria: A Study In The History Of Greek Algebra
 The Thirteen Books of Euclid's Elements: vol. 1, vol. 2, vol. 3
 The Thirteen Books of Euclid's Elements - Second Edition Revised with Additions: Vol. 1-3
 PDF files of many of Heath's works, including those on Diophantus, Apollonius, etc.

Excerpts from MacTutor
 Heath: Everyman's Library Euclid Introduction
 Heath: The thirteen books of Euclid's elements Preface
 Heath: Mathematics in Aristotle Preface

About T.L. Heath

1861 births
1940 deaths
British classical scholars
British historians of mathematics
Historians of science
People educated at Clifton College
Fellows of the British Academy
Fellows of the Royal Society
People educated at Caistor Grammar School
Alumni of Trinity College, Cambridge
Knights Commander of the Order of the Bath
Knights Commander of the Royal Victorian Order
19th-century British mathematicians
20th-century British mathematicians
Amateur mathematicians
Scholars of ancient Greek literature
Euclid